Gao Hongbin (born October 1971) is a Chinese politician who spent his entirely career in northeast China's Liaoning province. He was investigated by the Communist Party of China's anti-graft agency in December 2018. Previously he served as head of the United Front Department of CPC Liaoning Provincial Committee.

Early life and education
Gao was born in Penglai, Shandong in October 1971. He entered Northeastern University in September 1990, majoring in foundry at the Department of Materials Science and Engineering, where he graduated in July 1996.

Career
After university, he became an official in Dongling District of Shenyang, capital of northeast China's Liaoning province. He served as deputy magistrate of Faku County in September 2002, and four years later promoted to the Magistrate position. He served as general director of Assistance Program for Xinjiang briefly. He served as deputy party chief of Benxi from January 2012 to June 2015, and party chief, the top political position in the city, from June 2015 to June 2016. In June 2016, he was appointed party chief of Fushun, he remained in that position until September 2018, when he was transferred to Shenyang and appointed head of the United Front Department of CPC Liaoning Provincial Committee.

Downfall
On December 11, 2018, he has been placed under investigation for serious violations of laws and regulations by the Central Commission for Discipline Inspection (CCDI), the Communist Party's internal disciplinary body, and the National Supervisory Commission, the highest anti-corruption agency of China.

On June 6, 2019, his alleged crimes have also been transferred to prosecutors for further review. He was detained on June 19. On December 15, he was expelled from the Communist Party of China (CPC) and dismissed from public office.

References

External links

1971 births
Northeastern University alumni 
La Trobe University alumni
Living people
People's Republic of China politicians from Shandong
Chinese Communist Party politicians from Shandong